August François von Finck (born 2 May 1968) is a German businessman  and the son of August von Finck, Jr., thus grandson of August von Finck, Sr. August François von Finck's great-grandfather Wilhelm von Finck was the co-founder of the private bank Merck Finck & Co., the insurance companies Munich Re and Allianz – the second largest international insurance and financial services organization in the world. He is a German citizen but has his official residence in Switzerland.

History
Von Finck earned a MBA from Georgetown Business School.

As a member of the board of advisors of Georgetown University, where he obtained his MBA in 1999, he holds the majority of important companies such as SGS and Von Roll Holding AG in tandem with his family. August François von Finck has two brothers, Maximilian Rudolph von Finck (b. 1969) and Luitpold Ferdinand von Finck (b. 1971) and one sister, Maria Theresia von Finck.

Known simply as François von Finck during his high school days, he attended the Darrow School in New Lebanon, New York.

References 

German untitled nobility
McDonough School of Business alumni
1968 births
Living people
German expatriates in Switzerland
Finck family